The Shield is an American crime drama television created by Shawn Ryan and starring Michael Chiklis. The series premiered on FX on March 12, 2002 and ended on November 25, 2008, totaling 88 episodes over seven seasons, plus one additional mini-episode.

Series overview

Episodes

Season 1 (2002)
Captain David Aceveda, seeking to usurp the current black City Council representative of Farmington by swaying the Latino vote, looks to rid his precinct, The Barn, of corruption starting with Detective Vic Mackey and the controversial yet effective Strike Team. Mackey and the Strike Team protect local drug dealer Rondell Robinson by enforcing strict rules to make the streets safer. Aceveda works with the Justice Department to bring Detective Terry Crowley onto the Strike Team to try to gain evidence to use on Vic. However, Vic is aware of Crowley's involvement due to his friendship with the Assistant Chief of Police Ben Gilroy; when the Strike Team is forced to shoot and kill Two-Time, a drug dealer, Vic and Detective Shane Vendrell use Two-Time's gun to murder Crowley (without informing team members Detective Curtis "Lem" Lemansky and Detective Ronnie Gardocki), making it look like Crowley was killed by Two-Time. Gilroy helps Vic to cover up the murder and stops Aceveda's investigation. Things come to a breaking point towards the end of the season when Gilroy's own ambitions threaten both Vic's and Aceveda's future.

Separately, rookie officer Julien Lowe learns the ropes from his training officer Danielle "Danny" Sofer, as well as tries to hide his homosexuality from the others. Julien witnesses the Strike Team smuggling a portion of a drug bust for their own personal wealth and reports this to Aceveda. When Aceveda starts investigating Julien's claims, Vic threatens to reveal Julien's homosexuality to the department. Julien backs out from his witness statement, leaving Aceveda with nothing to go on.

Detective Holland "Dutch" Wagenbach and Detective Claudette Wyms hunt a serial killer targeting prostitutes while dealing with their own problems in The Barn. Vic, separately, has to deal with the growing rift between him and his wife Corrine, and learning his son Matthew is autistic, and uses his illicit police activities to pay for special schooling for him. Due to Vic's behavior, Corrine takes the children and disappears, leaving a note to Vic to not to come find them.

Season 2 (2003)
The Barn discovers that the Mexican drug gangs in Farmington are uniting under a new drug lord, Armadillo Quintero who is able to evade arrest due to lack of evidence and willing witnesses. Privately, the Strike Team learns that Armadillo has knowledge of some of their illicit activities and fear he will rat them out if he is taken to prison. They attempt to coerce Armadillo to return to Mexico by threatening to green light Armadillo's brother but Armadillo responds by having his brother murdered. Vic eventually loses his cool and burns half of Armadillo's face on stove burner only to have Armadillo do the same to Gardocki and use his new leverage against the Strike Team.

With the fallout of Gilroy's arrest The Barn, Aceveda, and Vic all find themselves under scrutiny of an independent auditor who is determined to find any corruption in The Barn. As Vic and Aceveda struggle to stay one step ahead their tactics draw the ire of Claudette who is determined to arrest Armadillo after he rapes a young girl. Claudette, initially reluctant to take a leadership role, eventually agrees to take over as The Barn's Captain after realizing she can't stay neutral any more.

Meanwhile, Danny fatally shoots a Muslim man who threatened her during a confrontation and Julien is unable to back her story. The widow threatens to sue the department and begins to create problems for Danny both professionally and personally. Shane and Lem convince a small-time criminal to kill Armadillo by passing him a knife after he is arrested and put into the cage by Danny. Separately, Vic has a private investigator search for Corrine and his kids, and eventually finds her seemingly preparing to file for divorce. He moves out of his home and preemptively files for divorce first as to have a better chance of retaining his parenting rights, but this only serves to widen the distance between them.

As the Armadillo case is resolved, the Strike Team learn that the Armenian Mob have a "money train" that passes through Farmington every so often, a means for the mob to launder their illegal funds into untraceable cash. The Strike Team privately plans to rob the money train, knowing that they would be set financially should they succeed. The season ends with the successful execution of the money train heist, Danny being fired, and Aceveda winning the primary.

Season 3 (2004)
In the aftermath of the money train heist the Strike Team resolves to lay low and avoid any controversy but quickly find themselves marginalized and lacking vital information. When some of the money from the heist is revealed to be marked for a federal case the team struggles to stay ahead of Dutch who begins to gradually suspect Vic. The Armenian mob sends Margos Dezerian, previously seen in season one, to find the money and kill anyone with anyone involved. As Margos and the investigation closes in on the Strike Team, Lem burns a majority of the money in a desperate attempt to protect the team ultimately leading to a confrontation which causes the Strike Team to split up in the season finale.

Claudette is promised a promotion to captain and maintains a supervising role throughout the season while Aceveda prepares to move on to the city council. Near the end of the season, a public defender is shot, and the ensuing investigation leads Claudette and Dutch to discover that the victim had been a heavy drug user for the past three years. Claudette, determined to ensure justice, explores further and becomes very unpopular with the D.A. and around the Barn because she reopens (against orders) the defender's lost cases. This results in her being denied the promotion to Captain of the Farmington District.

Shane begins a serious relationship with Mara and eventually proposes to her when they find out she is pregnant. Mara encourages Shane to be more independent from Vic even after discovering the money from the heist.  The conflict between Vic and Shane becomes personal by the end of the season leaving a deep rift between the two.

Dutch opens a case of a serial rapist and finds himself becoming more obsessed than usual without Claudette's backing. Julien, after suffering a beating during the season 2 finale has toughened considerably leading Claudette feeling alarmed that he may wash out. Danny makes a deal with Aceveda to be reinstated provided to provide him any pertinent information about other officers.

Season 4 (2005)
Monica Rawling (Glenn Close) takes over the role as Farmington's new captain, who implements controversial federal asset forfeiture laws to seize any property tied to drug dealing, using the money to fund the department and give back to the community. The season deals with the fallout from the Strike Team's disbandment. Shane Vendrell, with new partner Armando "Army" Renta (Michael Peña), enters into a dangerous situation when trying to control major drug lord Antwon Mitchell (Anthony Anderson), and seemingly accepts an order to kill Vic Mackey. The police are outraged after two officers are kidnapped and subsequently found murdered. In the end, the Strike Team is re-formed and manages to put Antwon in prison. The season also deals with the controversial asset-forfeiture policies of the new captain; Julien Lowe's opposition to these policies; and City Councilman David Aceveda's dealing with the psychological aftermath of his sexual assault incident from the previous season. The season concludes with Capt. Rawling's losing her job over a dispute with the DEA.

Other plots involve Claudette and Dutch's marginalization as detectives, because of Claudette's refusal to apologize to the DA for reopening the cases of a public defender discovered to have been a functioning drug addict. Claudette's moral stand results in many of the prosecutors' cases being overturned. This costs Claudette her shot at becoming the Farmington Captain. Dutch attempts to resolve the situation by making a back-room deal with the DA to "keep Claudette in line" and do favors for the office in return for breaking back into action.

Season 5 (2006)
The season revolves around Internal Affairs Division Lt. Jon Kavanaugh's (Forest Whitaker) investigation of the Strike Team and one of the greatest threats the team has ever faced. As a result of Kavanaugh's turning one of Mackey's informants, IAD became aware of Lem's heroin theft and failure to report during the Antwon Mitchell investigation. Finding the heroin gave IAD sufficient evidence to arrest Lem, but Kavanaugh informs him about his theory of Terry Crowley's death and has Lem wear a wire to get evidence on the Strike Team. Lem is able to warn Mackey he is wired and Mackey uses it to embarrass IAD. Kavanaugh, applying pressure to the team in any way he can, finds out about Mackey's share of the money train haul. After Mackey sleeps with Kavanaugh's wife for further humiliation Kavanaugh arrests Lem and makes a deal with Mitchell. Mackey supports Lem and gets bail, while Shane worries Lem will give evidence against the team. The season concludes with Shane, fooled by Aceveda into believing Lem was going to turn on the Strike Team, murdering his friend and fellow team member with a hand grenade.

Other plots include Dutch discovering Claudette has a chronic illness; Claudette's physical breaking point getting a killer from the past to confess; Steve Billings as the interim "jellyfish yes-man" Captain of the Barn; Danny dealing with pregnancy and refusing to divulge the father's name; Julien training Tina, a pretty but inept rookie officer who Dutch has a crush on; and Claudette finally getting her opportunity for promotion to captain of the Barn, which she accepts on the sole condition that she gets to run the Barn her way.

"Wins and Losses"
This 15-minute mini-episode was produced between the fifth and sixth seasons, and initially released to various websites in February 2007 as a promotion for season six. It was later made available on the Season 5 DVD set.

Season 6 (2007)
Continuing directly after season 5, Mackey and the Strike Team are distraught over Lem's death. Kavanaugh refuses to let the case die and resorts to Mackey's tactics of planting evidence and coercing witnesses to lie about the Strike Team, especially Mackey. Dutch and Claudette begin to suspect Kavanaugh's integrity. Kavanaugh finally confesses to his actions and finds himself under arrest.

The first half of the season deals with Mackey and Gardocki hunting and killing Guardo Lima, the Barn's main suspect in the murder of Lem. Shane, overcome by guilt, becomes reckless and suicidal and enters into an affair with a teenager associated with the new One-Niner boss. The last half of the season concludes with the breakdown of Mackey and Shane's friendship, as Shane admits having killed Lem. Shane threatens Mackey and Gardocki with revealing their illegal exploits should Mackey attempt to arrest him for Lem's killing. Shane tries to get protection with the Armenians and reveals Mackey was the ringleader behind the money train robbery putting Mackey's family in danger.

Mackey learns from Claudette that the Chief plans to force him into early retirement. After a bloody mass murder, Claudette learns the Barn could be shut down if no improvements are made by the time quarterly crime statistics are released. Julien joins the Strike Team under the leadership of a new and ineffective leader. Aceveda finds a new backer for his mayoral campaign but soon learns he might be in over his head. Dutch's relationship with Tina becomes complicated following meddling by Billings. In the final minutes of the season's last episode, Aceveda and Mackey agree to work together to take down Aceveda's new backers.

Season 7 (2008)
Mackey and Aceveda agree to work together to stop Cruz Pezuela, a developer acting as a front man for a Mexican cartel and a major backer of Aceveda’s mayoral ambitions. Vic spins it into a gang war between the Mexicans and Armenians as a way to protect himself and his family after Shane outed him to the Armenians as the man who robbed their money laundering operation. As the gang war spins out of control, Vic begins to cozy up to ICE Agent Olivia Murray as a way to bring more weight down on the cartel and to secure an ICE position for himself and Ronnie, along with complete immunity for their past crimes. 

Shane, despite holding his written confession as leverage over Vic and Ronnie, agrees to help stop the Armenian threat in order to protect his own family. At an arranged meeting between the Mexicans and Armenians, Vic and Ronnie tamper with Shane’s sidearm in an attempt to get him killed in revenge for Lem’s death. Shane escapes and hires a small-time enforcer to perform simultaneous hits on Vic and Ronnie. The attempt fails, forcing Shane to go on the run with Mara and Jackson and forcing Vic to give up his badge in order to catch and kill Shane and Mara. Mara uses Shane's leverage against Mackey to coerce Corrine into serving as a middleman to help her family escape the police.

After Mackey fails in attempt to kill Shane and Mara using Corrine’s information, Corrine contacts the Barn and agrees to help stop Vic as long as he never learns of her involvement. Dutch and Claudette begin a full-scale investigation into Vic and Ronnie in a final attempt to take down the Strike Team members once and for all. After a failed attempt to get Vic in the act of aiding and abetting a fugitive, Claudette fakes the arrest of Corrine in order to preserve her cover. Vic, thinking he needs to protect Corrine, leverages the bust of the Mexican cartel into a full immunity for himself and Corrine, foregoing Ronnie’s deal despite promising him they’d run together if things fell apart. As part of his deal with ICE, Vic confesses to all the crimes he and Strike Team committed, stunning Olivia and her boss, as well as Claudette and Dutch. 

Claudette, her health still deteriorating, nearly breaks down upon learning Vic is now immune. As a small bit of revenge and to protect Corrine, Claudette and Dutch arrange for Oliva to get Corrine and her kids into federal witness protection. When Vic gloats to Shane about his new deal, Shane reveals Corrine betrayed him to Claudette and Dutch as a way to prove Shane was always the better husband and father. Vic and Ronnie lead the cartel and the leadership of the black gangs into an ICE trap, which Aceveda uses as a publicity stunt for his mayoral campaign. Out of options, Shane poisons Mara and Jackson and shoots himself after writing out his confession as Claudette and her team arrive to arrest him.

The Barn informs Vic of Shane’s suicide.  When Mackey arrives Claudette places him in an interrogation room and confronts him with the fallout of all his actions. Unable to do anything more to Vic, Claudette orders Dutch and Julian to arrest Ronnie publicly for all the crimes Vic confessed to. Ronnie, shocked, screams that Vic betrayed him and killed the team.

The series ends with Corrine and her children in witness protection. Claudette admits to Dutch she’s dying but will remain Captain as long as she can. Olivia informs Vic of his new position writing reports at a desk for ICE. When Vic argues it wasn’t the terms he agreed to, Olivia reminds him any step out of line to the word of their agreement will violate his immunity. At the end of the show, Vic is at the ICE office after hours, putting pictures of his children, and himself and Lem, on his new desk. After hearing police sirens he pauses for a moment, before grabbing his gun and leaving.

Ratings

References

External links
 

Lists of American crime drama television series episodes
The Shield